Sir John Russell, 3rd Baronet (1632? – 1669), first a Royalist, but afterwards a colonel of foot for Parliament and distinguished himself at the Battle of Marston Moor, and in the Protectorate's wars in Ireland and Flanders.

Russell was the first son of Sir Francis Russell, 2nd Baronet. He was originally a Royalist, but later a colonel of foot under the Parliamentary general the Earl of Manchester, and distinguished himself both at the Battle of Marston Moor, and in the protector's wars in Ireland and Flanders. He enjoyed the office of chamberlain of Chester during these times, and probably many others of consequence.

Sir John died in 1669, and was buried in Chippenham, on 24 March of the same year.

Russell married Frances Cromwell, youngest daughter of the Protector Oliver Cromwell, and widow of Lord Robert Rich, predeceased son of Robert Rich, 3rd Earl of Warwick. She long survived Sir John, spending the latter part of her life with her sister Lady Fauconberg, though she had so great a jointure from her first husband, that she was a great misfortune to the Russell family, having dissipated the greatest part of the very fine estate at Chippenham. Sir John and Lady Frances had three sons and two daughters:
Sir William Russell, 4th Baronet (c. 1660–1725)
Christian Russell (d. 1669), died young
Elizabeth Russell (1664–1733), married Sir Thomas Frankland, 2nd Baronet of Thirkelby.
Maj.-Gen. Rich Russell (c. 1667–1735)
John Russell (1670–1735), President of Bengal

Notes

References
Noble, Mark. Memoirs of the protectorate-house of Cromwell: deduced from an early period, and continued down to the present time, Volume II, Printed Pearson and Rollason, sold by R. Baldwin [etc.] London, 1784.
Burke, Bernard. The general armory of England, Scotland, Ireland, and wales: comprising a registry of armorial bearings from the earliest to the present time, Harrison & sons, 1864.

Attribution

Further reading 
 Burke, Bernard. A genealogical and heraldic history of the extinct and dormant baronetcies of England, Ireland, and Scotland, J. R. Smith, 1844. p. 456

1630s births
1669 deaths
Roundheads
Baronets in the Baronetage of England